Shazia Tariq (born 18 December 1983) is a Pakistani politician who was a Member of the Provincial Assembly of the Punjab, from May 2013 to May 2018.

Early life and education
She was born on 18 December 1983 in Gujranwala.

She earned the degree of Bachelor of Arts from Government College for Women, Gujranwala in 2003 and the degree of Bachelor of Education from Allama Iqbal Open University in 2007.

Political career

She was elected to the Provincial Assembly of the Punjab as a candidate of Pakistan Muslim League (N) on a reserved seat for women in 2013 Pakistani general election.

References

Living people
Women members of the Provincial Assembly of the Punjab
Punjab MPAs 2013–2018
1983 births
Pakistan Muslim League (N) politicians
Allama Iqbal Open University alumni
21st-century Pakistani women politicians